A bronze statue of Captain John Fane Charles Hamilton was installed for seven years, in Hamilton, New Zealand, from in 2013 until removal in June 2020.

The settlement of Hamilton (now a city) was named after Captain Hamilton, a British naval officer who was killed in action during colonial invasion of Maori land at the Battle of Gate Pā.

History
The life-size statue by Margriet Windhausen was gifted to Hamilton City by the Gallagher Group in 2013 "to celebrate 75 years in business".

Removal
In 2017 the donor's CEO, Sir William Gallagher, gave an Institute of Directors speech describing the Treaty of Waitangi as a fraud and denied it involved a partnership between Māori and the Crown. About a dozen directors walked out of the speech in protest. 

The statue was defaced with red paint in August 2018. 

In June 2020, ahead of a George Floyd protest in the US, the Hamilton City Council discussed the statue with Sir William's brother and fellow director, John Gallagher, then slated it for removal, after a request by Māori tribal confederation Waikato Tainui. 

On 12 June 2020, the Hamilton City Council removed the statue of Captain Hamilton.

See also

 List of monuments and memorials removed during the George Floyd protests
 George Floyd protests in New Zealand

References

2013 establishments in New Zealand
2013 sculptures
Bronze sculptures in New Zealand
Buildings and structures in Hamilton, New Zealand
Monuments and memorials removed during the George Floyd protests
Outdoor sculptures in New Zealand
Sculptures of men in New Zealand
Statues in New Zealand
Tourist attractions in Hamilton, New Zealand
Statues removed in 2020